Jan de Wit can refer to:

 Jan de Wit (born 1945), Dutch lawyer and politician
 Jan de Wit (chef), of restaurants De Trechter, De Nederlanden (restaurant), and Le Restaurant
 Jan de Wit, author of Anna Kournikova (computer virus)